Saks is a German surname, meaning a person from the region of Saxony (originally Sachsen). The region is named after the Germanic tribe which settled there in Roman times. The name may refer to:

People
Adam Saks (born 1974), Danish painter
Andrew Saks (1847–1912), American businessman
Elyn Saks (born 1956), American legal scholar
Gene Saks (1921–2015), American film director and actor 
Gidon Saks (born 1960), South African singer
Kaido Saks (born 1986), Estonian basketball player 
Katrin Saks (born 1956), Estonian politician
Michael Saks (mathematician) (born 1951), American mathematician
Michael J. Saks (born 1947), American legal scholar
Sol Saks (1910–2011), American screenwriter 
Stanislaw Saks (1897–1942), Polish mathematician
Tarmo Saks (born 1975), Estonian football player
Toby Saks (1942–2013), American cellist

See also
Sachs
Sacks (surname)
Sax (surname)
Saxe (surname)

Notes

German-language surnames
Estonian-language surnames